Melissa Cooper may refer to:

 Melissa Cooper, a member of Citizens for Constitutional Freedom
 Melissa "Missy" Cooper, a character in The Big Bang Theory and Young Sheldon